Harts Bluff Independent School District (HBISD) is a public school district in Titus County, Texas (USA). Named after the Harts Bluff Farm to Market Road, the district is surrounded by the Mount Pleasant Independent School District.

It serves a section of the Mount Pleasant city limits.

HBISD's single campus, Harts Bluff Elementary, serves students in grades kindergarten through ninth. The district also maintains Harts Bluff Early College High School.

History
The Nevill's Chapel Common School District and the Oak Grove Common School District merged into Harts Bluff ISD in 1959 due to declining enrollment in Oak Grove. The campus was built equally between the two consolidated schools. The Midway School District later merged into Harts Bluff ISD.

In 2009, the school district was rated "recognized" by the Texas Education Agency.

References

External links
Harts Bluff ISD

School districts in Titus County, Texas
1959 establishments in Texas
School districts established in 1959